Christopher Hargreaves was an Oxford college head in the 16th-century.

Hargreaves was Proctor in 1554; and Rector of Lincoln College, Oxford, from 155 until his death on 15 October 1558. He was buried at All Saints Church, Oxford.

References

1558 deaths
Rectors of Lincoln College, Oxford
16th-century English people